Nainar Nagendran is an Indian politician of the Bharatiya Janata Party (BJP) in the state of Tamil Nadu.

Political career
He left the All India Anna Dravida Munnetra Kazhagam (AIADMK) party in August 2017 to join the Bharatiya Janata Party. He was one of several AIADMK figures to do so and soon after his move he was appointed a state-level BJP vice-president.

As an AIADMK candidate, Nagendran was elected as a Member of the Legislative Assembly (MLA) from Tirunelveli constituency in the 2001 and 2011 state assembly elections. He lost the seat by 606 votes in the election of 2006 and in 2016, when the difference was 601. His opponent in the latter election was A. L. S. Lakshmanan of the Dravida Munnetra Kazhagam (DMK), a person he had beaten in 2011 by over 38,000 votes.

Nagendran served variously as a Minister for Electricity, Industry and Transport during the AIADMK-led government of 2001–2006. He was not a member of the cabinet during the AIADMK government led by Jayalalithaa from 2011 but he said it was her death and the subsequent rudderless situation in which the party found itself that caused his move to the BJP in 2017

In 2021, as a BJP candidate Nagendran has been elected to Tamil Nadu state assembly from Tirunelveli constituency for the third time defeating the DMK candidate by a margin of 23,107 votes. In addition he has been also selected as the leader of BJP members in Tamil Nadu assembly.

Disproportionate assets case
Tamil Nadu's Directorate of Vigilance and Anti-Corruption conducted raids  in 12 places belonging to Nagendran in various parts of Chennai city and in his native place of southern Tirunelveli district and in Kochi. Later, investigation conducted in 2006 revealed the accumulation of Nainar Nagendran's assets in excess of his income when he was a minister of Industry, Power and Transport during the AIADMK rule. Vigilant police investigation has revealed that Nagendran bought property including gold jewellery and lands for more than 3 crore 9 lakh 97 thousand 97 rupees. A chargesheet was filed in December 2010 against Nainar Nagendran his wife and four other relatives under the Prevention of Corruption Act for Rs 3.9 crore disproportionate assets case by Directorate of Vigilance.

Controversy 
Nainar Nagendran has sent death threats against acclaimed Tamil lyricist and writer Vairamuthu in January 2018 for his controversial remarks on Andal. Nagendran has announced that BJP leaders are ready to award a cash reward of ₹10 crore for anyone slays and chops the tongue of writer Vairamuthu. He also said there should be no hesitation in killing even those people who speak ill of Hinduism. This created a huge controversy in Tamil Nadu. Later, he was arrested together with Hindu Munnani state vice-president VC Jayabalan for provocative hate speech that would cause divisiveness among the people and posed a threat to national unity.

References 

All India Anna Dravida Munnetra Kazhagam politicians
Living people
State cabinet ministers of Tamil Nadu
Tamil Nadu MLAs 2001–2006
Tamil Nadu MLAs 2011–2016
Bharatiya Janata Party politicians from Tamil Nadu
Year of birth missing (living people)
Tamil Nadu MLAs 2021–2026